Parapediasia torquatella is a moth in the family Crambidae. It was described by Bernard Landry in 1995. It is found in North America, where it has been recorded from Arizona, California, Colorado and New Mexico.

References

Crambini
Moths described in 1995
Moths of North America